Kiwaia calaspidea is a moth in the family Gelechiidae. It was described by Charles E. Clarke in 1934. It is endemic to New Zealand.

The wingspan is about 14 mm. The forewings are brownish fuscous, with a darker distal dot, and dark suffusion on the extremity of the apex. The hindwings are light fuscous.

References

Kiwaia
Moths described in 1934
Endemic fauna of New Zealand
Moths of New Zealand
Endemic moths of New Zealand